Hong Su-jong (born 9 March 1986 or 1989 in Hamgyong, North Korea) is a North Korean artistic gymnast. She is the 2007 World silver medalist on the vault. She competed at the 2004 Summer Olympics in the all-around and in the team event.

She is the twin sister of Hong Un-jong.

Career 
Hong Su-Jong made the national gymnastics team in 2003. She competed in the 2003 Summer Universiade for her international debut.
She competed at the 2004 Summer Olympics in the all-around, but did not qualify for the final. At the 2006 Asian Games she won a gold medal on the uneven bars, a silver medal on vault and with her team, and bronze in the all-around. She won a silver medal on vault at the 2007 World Championships. She injured herself before the 2008 Summer Olympics and was unable to compete.

Hong was suspended for two years, from late 2007 to late 2009, following a positive test for furosemide at the Good Luck Beijing pre-Olympic test event.

2010 age controversy

In October 2010, It was announced Hong Su-jong was under investigation after several discrepancies surfaced over her reported year of birth and age-eligibility for senior competition.

Subsequently, North Korea was banned from taking part in the 2010 World Artistic Gymnastics Championships, as the Fédération Internationale de Gymnastique announced it was not satisfied with the explanation provided by North Korea for having entered Hong Su-jong with three different birth dates (1985, 1986 or 1989), in different competitions. In particular, she had taken part in the 2004 Olympics claiming to have been born in 1985; her subsequently announced birth date of 1989 meant that she would have been too young to compete in 2004.

In November 2010, the F.I.G. announced that due to the age discrepancies, North Korean gymnasts were banned from all international competition until 5 October 2012. The North Korean Federation was also fined USD $20,800, and Hong specifically was banned from competing in even national competition within North Korea.

Hong's age has never been officially established, but a video has surfaced in which Hong Un-jong, whose birth year is known to be 1989, states that Hong Su-jong is her twin. If accurate, this would confirm that Hong Su-jong was underage during the 2004 Olympics.

References

External links
 
 
 

1986 births
Living people
Medalists at the World Artistic Gymnastics Championships
North Korean female artistic gymnasts
Olympic gymnasts of North Korea
Gymnasts at the 2004 Summer Olympics
North Korean twins
Age controversies in sports
Asian Games medalists in gymnastics
Gymnasts at the 2006 Asian Games
Asian Games gold medalists for North Korea
Asian Games silver medalists for North Korea
Asian Games bronze medalists for North Korea
Medalists at the 2006 Asian Games
21st-century North Korean women